The 2008 Pacific Life Holiday Bowl was a college football bowl game played on December 30, 2008, at Qualcomm Stadium in San Diego, California between the Oklahoma State Cowboys and the Oregon Ducks, and was part of the 2008 NCAA Division I FBS football season and one of the games in the 2008-2009 bowl season to be nationally televised by ESPN. The Ducks won the contest, 42–31.

Scoring summary

Scoring summary

References

Holiday Bowl
Holiday Bowl
Oklahoma State Cowboys football bowl games
Oregon Ducks football bowl games
Holiday Bowl